Route 128 is a  state highway in the U.S. state of Rhode Island. The highway links U.S. Route 6A (US 6A), US 6 and US 44.

Route description
Route 128 begins at a signalized intersection with Hartford Avenue (US 6A) and Killingly Street. The highway follows Killingly north towards a partial cloverleaf interchange with US 6 before continuing north through residential neighborhoods. At an T-intersection with Greenville Avenue, Route 128 turns northwest before terminating at the Putnam Pike (US 44).

Major intersections

See also

References

External links

2019 Highway Map, Rhode Island

128
Transportation in Providence County, Rhode Island